The Acasta Gneiss is a tonalite gneiss in the Slave craton in the Northwest Territories, Canada. The rock body is exposed on an island about 300 kilometres north of Yellowknife. The rock of the outcrop was metamorphosed 3.58 to 4.031 billion years ago and is one of the oldest known intact crustal fragments on Earth.

First described in 1989, it was named for the nearby Acasta River east of Great Bear Lake. The Acasta outcrop is found in a remote area of the Tłı̨chǫ people land settlement. It is the oldest known exposed rock formation in the world.

Formation 
The metamorphic rock exposed in the outcrop was previously a granitoid that formed 4.03 billion years ago, an age based on radiometric dating of zircon crystals at 4.031 Ga. The Acasta Gneiss is important in establishing the early history of the continental crust. Acasta Gneiss was formed in the Basin Groups unofficial period of the Hadean eon, which came before the Archean: see Timetable of the Precambrian.

Contention for record 
In 2008 an age of 4.28 billion years was reported for an outcrop in the Nuvvuagittuq Greenstone Belt on the eastern shores of Hudson Bay, 40 kilometres south of Inukjuak, Quebec, Canada. However, the dating method used did not involve similar radiometric dating of zircon crystals and it remains somewhat contentious whether the reported date represents the age that the rock itself formed or a residual isotopic signature of older material that melted to form the rock.
 
Mafic rocks from the Nuvvuagittuq Greenstone Belt have recorded isotopic compositions that can be produced only in the Hadean eon (i.e. older  than 4 billion years ago) and the complete isotopic study of all the lithologies included in the Nuvvuagittuq Greenstone Belt suggests that it was formed nearly 4.4 billion years ago.

Exhibit 
 In 2003 a team from the Smithsonian Institution collected a four-tonne boulder of Acasta Gneiss for display outside the National Museum of the American Indian in Washington, D.C. Another sample is on display in the Museu de Geociências of the University of Brasília, Brazil.
 In October 2016, a sample of Acasta Gneiss was placed on public display at the Clark Planetarium in Salt Lake City, Utah, USA alongside samples of stromatolite and banded iron formation.
 In 2006, Peter Skinner and Bert Cervo contributed a small sample of the rock to the Six String Nation project. Part of that material was inlaid into the first fret of Voyageur, the guitar at the heart of the project.
 On the campus of the University of Waterloo in Waterloo, Canada, a boulder from the Acasta Gneiss has been placed in the Peter Russell Rock Garden.

See also
 Age of the Earth
 Oldest dated rocks

References

Bibliography
 Stern, R.A., Bleeker, W., 1998. Age of the world's oldest rocks refined using Canada's SHRIMP. the Acasta gneiss complex, Northwest Territories, Canada. Geoscience Canada, v. 25, pp. 27–31

Gneiss
Hadean
Stratigraphy of the Northwest Territories
Rock formations of Canada